Lillesand is the administrative centre of Lillesand municipality in Agder county, Norway.

Lillesand Church is located in the town and it is the seat of the Vest-Nedenes prosti (deanery). The European route E18 passes by the town, one of the main roads along southeastern Norway. The Blindleia strait is an inland waterway that leads from the Høvåg area northwards to the town of Lillesand.

History
The village of Lillesand grew up significantly during the 17th century around its natural harbour. In 1821, the village area was granted the status as a ladested (a sea port with special trading rights). In 1838, the new formannskapsdistrikt law established each parish in Norway as a self-governing local municipality and each ladested was separate from its surrounding parish. This meant that Lillesand became self-governing like the new civil municipalities. Later, in 1952, the town became classified as a bykommune (town-municipality).

During the 1960s, there were many municipal mergers across Norway due to the work of the Schei Committee. On 1 January 1962, the town of Lillesand (population: 1,041) was merged with the neighboring municipalities of Høvåg (population: 1,330) and Vestre Moland (population: 2,454) and the Gitmark farm area (population: 22) in the neighboring municipality of Eide. Together, this new municipality was called Lillesand, but it lost is status as a bykommune (town) because of this merger. In 1996, the law changed and this enabled the municipal council of Lillesand to declare town status for Lillesand once again.

Media gallery

See also
List of towns and cities in Norway

References

External links

Lillesand
Port cities and towns of the North Sea
Port cities and towns in Norway
Cities and towns in Norway
Populated places in Agder
1821 establishments in Norway
1961 disestablishments in Norway
1996 establishments in Norway